Roker is a tourist resort and affluent area of Sunderland, North East England, bounded on the south by the River Wear and Monkwearmouth, on the east by the North Sea, to the west by Fulwell and on the north by Seaburn.  It is administered as part of the City of Sunderland and lies within historic County Durham.

The majority of the houses in Roker are terraced or semi-detached. Further west, to the part bordering Fulwell, are cul-de-sacs with semi-detached bungalows, these being owned mainly by members of Roker's sizeable elderly population.  On Roker Terrace (Roker's main street) are exclusive apartments and hotels which overlook the seafront.

In addition to Seaburn seafront, the coast at Roker seafront plays host to Sunderland International Airshow, the biggest free airshow in Europe, which takes place each year, usually over the last weekend in July.

History

The story of Roker began in 1587, when the Abbs family were granted land on the north side of the River Wear on the condition that they provided six soldiers to defend the mouth of the river. Fast forward to 1840, when Roker Terrace was built upon the cliff tops, along with Monkwearmouth baths and Roker Park soon after. The pier and lower promenade were built six years later. In 1898 Roker Park Stadium was built and Roker became known worldwide for being home to Sunderland A.F.C. The stadium was used for ninety-nine years until 1997. In the early 20th century Roker became a hugely popular resort for locals and tourists alike, and in 1928 it was taken over by the Borough of Sunderland, along with Fulwell and Seaburn.

In 1995 Roker Park Conservation Area was declared.

Landmarks
St Andrew's Church (1905–07) is recognised as one of the finest churches of the first half of the twentieth century and the masterpiece of Edward Schroeder Prior.

One well-known landmark of sorts in Roker is the Bungalow Cafe, which is an old-fashioned café in a tiny bungalow on the upper promenade. Also famous is the signpost next to the café, marked: "To Beach" (pointing towards the beach), "To Village" (pointing into Roker), "To Bungalow" (pointing to the cafe), and "To Germany" (pointing out to sea).

A museum is located in the Roker Watch House  which was originally opened in 1906 as the headquarters of the Roker Volunteer Life Brigade.  It is open every Sunday afternoon and on Bank Holiday Mondays.

Other nearby landmarks are the statue of Bede's cross on the cliff top near Roker Park and St Peter's Church, Monkwearmouth. The cross recognises the work of the Venerable Bede, who worked in the North-East all his life at the twin monasteries of Wearmouth and Jarrow. There is bid for the twin monasteries to gain World Heritage Site status.

Lighthouses and pier

From 1717 the newly formed River Wear Commission began to improve the harbour entrance at the mouth of the Wear. By 1750 a pair of breakwaters had been built (which survive in truncated form as the 'Old' North and South Piers).

By the beginning of the next century each had a lighthouse at its end. (The lighthouse which stands today in Roker Cliff Park originally stood on the Old South Pier; it was deactivated in 1903 and removed eighty years later.)

With the growth of Sunderland as a port, it was decided to improve the approach to the river by creating an outer harbour, protected by a new pair of new breakwaters curving out into the North Sea from the shore on each side. The new piers were the brainchild of Henry Hay Wake, who at the age of 25 had been appointed Chief Engineer to the River Wear Commission (in succession to Thomas Meik) in 1868. The foundation stone for the New North Pier (Roker Pier) was laid on 14 September 1885. Applauded at the time as a triumph of engineering, the  pier is built of granite-faced concrete blocks, which were loaded onto wagons at River Weir Works by a Goliath crane and unloaded and placed at the end of the pier by a Titan crane.

The opposite 'New South Pier' was begun at around the same time but never fully completed due to the start of the First World War; the twin lighthouse planned for its end was never built.

Roker Pier Lighthouse

The lighthouse at the pier head was completed in 1903. Its distinctive stripes are of naturally coloured red and white Aberdeen granite. When built it was said to be Britain's most powerful port lighthouse. Equipped with a third-order rotating catadioptric optic (consisting of a single-panel Fresnel lens backed by a prismatic mirror), it displayed a single flash every five seconds. The lighthouse had initially (like its predecessors) been lit by gas from the town mains, but the supply to the end of the pier was found to be intermittent so the gas light was soon replaced by a Chance Brothers incandescent petroleum vapour mantle lamp.

A fog siren was also provided, powered by compressed air from a pair of 7-horsepower gas engines located in the basement. It gave a two-second blast every twenty seconds in foggy weather from a sounder on the parapet, which was regulated by clockwork.

The light was semi-automated in 1936 when a new light system was installed by AGA. The main lamp was a 750-watt incandescent light bulb, with a gas mantle lamp (fed from the town supply) provided as a stand-by, activated by an automatic lamp changer; and a small electric motor automatically wound the clockwork which rotated the lens.

The system was supervised remotely from the Pilot House on the Old North Pier. Subsequent to its removal the 1903 optic was added to the maritime collection of Sunderland Museum and Art Gallery.

In 2007 the lighting system was again replaced with a dual-drive Pelangi PRL400 rotating pedestal and lamp.

Roker Pier Lighthouse still functions today. Both pier and lighthouse have undergone significant refurbishment in recent years. In 2012, as part of the restoration, a new flashing LED lamp array was installed, replacing the small Pelangi unit previously in use. In 2018, following a comprehensive six-year process of refurbishment, the lighthouse was opened to the public for the first time; regular guided tours now take place, with access provided by way of the tunnel which runs the length of the pier.

Demographics
The population of Roker is approximately 4,600.  Since the redevelopment of former brownfield areas of heavy industry into affluent riverside housing areas, and the founding of the St Peters Campus of the University of Sunderland to the immediate south of the area, Roker has undergone rapid demographic change.  The first of these two changes brought a large influx of professional and managerial workers into the areas now known as St Peters Riverside and North Haven.  The arrival of the university campus has seen a large number of the larger houses in the vicinity of Roker Avenue being converted into flats and student residences.  The pursuant studentification has brought a substantial Chinese community into the area for the first time, along with a variety of other nationalities

Along with the district of Monkwearmouth, Roker forms the St Peter's electoral ward on Sunderland City Council, which is a division of the Sunderland Central parliamentary seat. St Peter's ward was a safe Conservative ward in the 1980s, but became a battleground between the Conservatives and Labour in the 1990s and has remained as such ever since. Of the wards three council seats, all three are held by the Conservatives.

Streetname traditions
On the site of Sunderland AFC's former stadium is a small housing estate, its street names all being references to the football club (Clockstand Close, Goalmouth Close, Promotion Close, Midfield Drive etc.). The streets in between Roker Baths Road and Roker Avenue are all named after members of William Ewart Gladstone's cabinet (Gladstone, Hartington, Forster, Bright, Stansfield, and so on).

References

External links

Roker Pier
BBC Wear – Take a tour of Roker Beach
BBC Wear – Pictures: Walk from Roker to Seaburn
360° view of the Roker seafront
St Peter's Church, Monkwearmouth

City of Sunderland suburbs
Populated coastal places in Tyne and Wear
Sunderland